Hendrikus "Dick" Mulderij (9 October 1949 – 27 October 2020) was a Dutch footballer who played as a central defender.

Club career
Born in Apeldoorn, Mulderij started his career at local amateur side WSV Apeldoorn and later joined Tweede Divisie club AGOVV. He left them for Heracles '74 in 1971 after AGOVV was demoted from  professional football. He then played in the Eredivisie for Vitesse (with Gerard Somer moving the other way around in 1975) after clinching promotion from the Eerste Divisie with them in 1976-77 and moved to their eternal rivals N.E.C. after Vitesse's relegation back to the second tier in 1980. After losing the 1983 KNVB Cup Final to Ajax, Mulderij played with NEC in their 1983–84 European Cup Winners' Cup campaign where they were beaten by Spanish giants FC Barcelona in the second round. He exchanged his shirt with Johan Cruyff after the 1983 Cup Final, it proved to be the last one Cruyff wore for Ajax and was later auctioned for a Cancer Foundation. Mulderij retired from playing in 1984.

He amassed over 500 matches in professional football.

Managerial career
Mulderij returned to Vitesse to become a youth coach and later managed amateur sides AGOVV and WSV.

Personal life
After retiring from professional football, Mulderij ran an insurance company. He was married to Ineke and they had three children. They lived in Klarenbeek.

References

1949 births
2020 deaths
Sportspeople from Apeldoorn
Association football central defenders
Dutch footballers
AGOVV Apeldoorn players
Heracles Almelo players
SBV Vitesse players
NEC Nijmegen players
Tweede Divisie players
Eerste Divisie players
Eredivisie players
Footballers from Gelderland